Limu Chah (also Romanized as Līmū Chāh and Limoo Chah; also known as Līmūchā, Limucha, and Lunichi) is a village in Gafsheh-ye Lasht-e Nesha Rural District, Lasht-e Nesha District, Rasht County, Gilan Province, Iran. At the 2006 census, its population was 638, in 201 families.

References 

Populated places in Rasht County